A satellite tornado is a tornado that revolves around a larger, primary tornado and interacts with the same mesocyclone. Satellite tornadoes occur apart from the primary tornado and are not considered subvortices; the primary tornado and satellite tornadoes are considered to be separate tornadoes. The cause of satellite tornadoes is not known. Such tornadoes are more often anticyclonic than are typical tornadoes and these pairs may be referred to as tornado couplets. Satellite tornadoes commonly occur in association with very powerful, large, and destructive tornadoes, indicative also of the strength and severity of the parent supercell thunderstorm.

Satellite tornadoes are relatively uncommon. When a satellite tornado does occur, there is often more than one orbiting satellite spawned during the life cycle of the tornado or with successive primary tornadoes spawned by the parent supercell (a process known as cyclic tornadogenesis and leading to a tornado family). On tornado outbreak days, if satellite tornadoes occur with one supercell, there is an elevated probability of their occurrence with other supercells.

Satellite tornadoes may merge into their companion tornado although often the appearance of this occurring is an illusion caused when an orbiting tornado revolves around the backside of a primary tornado obscuring view of the satellite. During the March 1990 Central United States tornado outbreak, one member of a tornado family (rated F5) constricted and became a satellite tornado of the next tornado of the family before merging into the new primary tornado which soon also intensified to F5.

Examples

Some examples of tornado couplets include the Tri-State Tornado, multiple tornadoes during the 1999 Oklahoma tornado outbreak, the 2007 Greensburg tornado, and the 2013 El Reno tornado. Satellite tornadoes are more likely to be recognized in recent decades than in the far past as eyewitness accounts as well as damage survey information are often available for later events. The advent of storm chasing, in particular, boosts the likelihood that satellite tornadoes are noticed visually and/or on mobile radar. These tornadoes may remain over open country and thus cause less structural damage and consequently are less widely known. Such examples include near Beloit, Kansas on 15 May 1990 and during Project VORTEX near Allison, Texas on 8 June 1995, among other events.

See also 

 List of tornadoes with confirmed satellite tornadoes
 Fujiwhara effect
 Multiple-vortex tornado

References

External links
 Satellite tornado (by Roger Edwards)
 

Tornado
Tornadogenesis
Satellite tornadoes